Adult Contemporary is a chart published by Billboard ranking the top-performing songs in the United States in the adult contemporary music (AC) market, based on weekly airplay data from radio stations compiled by Broadcast Data Systems.

In the issue of Billboard dated January 2, "White Christmas" by Meghan Trainor featuring Seth MacFarlane was at number one, its fourth week in the top spot. The following week it was replaced by "Blinding Lights" by Canadian singer the Weeknd, which returned to number one following a five-week run in the previous year, and topped the chart for 30 non-consecutive weeks.  Its run was ended by "Levitating" by English singer Dua Lipa in the issue of Billboard dated July 31.  "Blinding Lights" then returned to the top spot for a single week only for "Levitating" to replace it once again and hold the top spot for 12 consecutive weeks.  The total of 35 weeks which the song spent at number one on the AC chart was one week short of the record held by "Girls Like You" by Maroon 5 and Cardi B.

In the issue dated November 13, British singer Adele topped the chart with "Easy on Me", which was her first chart topper since 2016.  The song reached number one in its fourth week on the listing, the fastest rise to the top spot by a non-Christmas song since the same singer's track "Hello" in 2015 and tied for the second-fastest such rise since the chart began to be based on Nielsen data in 1993. It was replaced by another song by a British singer, Ed Sheeran's "Bad Habits", which reached the top spot in its 22nd week on the chart.  In the issue dated December 11, Canadian singer Michael Bublé topped the chart with his version of the 1940s song "Let It Snow! Let It Snow! Let It Snow!".  The song continued a trend of Christmas-themed tracks topping the AC chart in December, reflecting the fact that adult contemporary radio stations usually switch to playing exclusively festive songs in the period leading up to the holiday.

Chart history

References

2021
Number-one adult contemporary singles
United States Adult Contemporary